1Q may refer to:

First quarter of a calendar year
Sirena (airline) (IATA code)
1q, an arm of Chromosome 1 (human)
SSH 1Q (WA); see Washington State Route 505
AH-1Q, a model of Bell AH-1 Cobra
P4M-1Q, a model of Martin P4M Mercator
A3D-1Q, a model of Douglas A-3 Skywarrior
AD-1Q, a model of Douglas A-1 Skyraider

See also
Q1 (disambiguation)